NGC 4522 is an edge-on spiral galaxy located about 60 million light-years away within the Virgo Cluster in the constellation Virgo. NGC 4522 is losing its molecular gas though ram-pressure stripping as it plows though the cluster at a speed of more than 10 million kilometres per hour. The galaxy was discovered by astronomer John Herschel on January 18, 1828.

Ram-pressure stripping
The selectively disturbed interstellar medium (ISM) of NGC 4522, together with a normal-appearing stellar disk, strongly suggest that the galaxy is undergoing ram-pressure stripping caused by an interaction between the intracluster medium (ICM) of the surrounding Virgo Cluster with the ISM of the galaxy itself.

However at NGC 4522's projected distance from Messier 87 (~1 Mpc), and assumption of a static smooth ICM and other "standard values", the force of the ram-pressure stripping exerted at the galaxy's location appears to be an order of magnitude less than needed to cause the observed truncation of the galaxy's gas disk. Despite this,  NGC 4522 may have recently passed through a region of enhanced ICM density. Possibly, the infall of the Messier 49 group into the Virgo Cluster has stirred up the ICM of the cluster, locally enhancing the ram pressure exerted on NGC 4522.

Features
In NGC 4522, there are several features that have been suggested to be attributes of ram-pressure stripping.

The northeast region of NGC 4522, contains a large, continuous dust lane that curves out of the disk of the galaxy that is known as "The dust upturn”. The region also contains a wide lane of stars, including many young blue stars that has been named "The stellar upturn". At the top of the upturn, there are a couple of distinct HII regions.

The southwest region features a number of decoupled extraplanar dust clouds and an arm structure containing a number of HII regions and groupings of bright young blue stars.

Star formation
As a consequence of ram-pressure stripping, NGC 4522 has a shrunken star forming disk with an enhanced rate of star formation in the inner regions while there is lack of star formation in the outer disk.

Some of the newly formed stars in NGC 4522 are forming in H II regions in filaments of stripped gas rising from the star forming disk of the galaxy. These stars may enter the halo of NGC 4522 or escape into intergalactic space.

See also
 List of NGC objects (4001–5000)
 NGC 4402
 ESO 137-001

References

External links

Virgo (constellation)
Spiral galaxies
4522
41729
7711
Astronomical objects discovered in 1828
Virgo Cluster
Discoveries by John Herschel